Kálmán Csathó (13 October 1881, Budapest – 14 February 1964, Budapest) was a Hungarian writer, theater director, and member of the Hungarian Academy of Sciences from 1933 to 1949 and vice-president of the Kisfaludy Society. He was also married to actress Ilona Aczél.

Career 
He graduated with a degree in law in Budapest, and studied theater in Berlin. When he returned to Hungary in 1906, he worked as a clerk in the ministry of culture. He went on a study tour on a state scholarship to Paris, then from 1909 in Budapest, worked first as a director at the National Theatre, then from 1919 onward as its chief director. In 1936, he was the vice-president of the Kisfaludy Society. In 1940, he became the director of the Magyar Theatre and the Andrássy Street Theatre. He was a corresponding member of the Hungarian Academy of Sciences between 1933 and 1949, and in 1989, his membership was reinstated posthumously.

He was buried in Farkasréti Cemetery.

Works 
 A varjú a toronyórán (1916)
 Te csak pipálj, Ladányi (1916)
 Juliska néni (1918)
 Ibolyka/Pókháló (1920)
 Mikor az öregek fiatalok voltak (1921)
 Földiekkel játszó égi tünemény (1924)
 Leányok, anyák, nagyanyák I-III. (1928)
 Most kél a nap (1928)
 Leányos ház 1931-ben (1931)
 Kluger és társa (1933)
 Családfa (1934)
 A szép Juhászné (1936)
 Az én lányom nem olyan (1936)
 Barátom, Bálint (1938)
 A kék táska
 A nők titka
 Maskara
 Vadászzsákmány (1940)
 A régi Nemzeti Színház (1960)
 Tavasztól tavaszig (1962)
 Írótársak között (1965)

Plays 
 Az új rokon (1922)
 A házasságok az égben köttetnek (1925)
 Mi van a kulisszák mögött (1926)
 Matyika színésznő szeretne lenni (1929)
 Fűszer és csemege (1938)
 Ilyeneknek láttam őket (1957)
 A régi Nemzeti Színház (1960)
 Tavasztól tavaszig (1962)
 Lilla

Further reading 
 Ki kicsoda a magyar irodalomban? Tárogató könyvek

External links 
 [ History of Hungarian literature 1946-1975]

1881 births
1964 deaths
Members of the Hungarian Academy of Sciences
Hungarian theatre directors
Hungarian writers
Theatre managers and producers
Burials at Farkasréti Cemetery